Tom Carlson (born December 9, 1941) is a politician in the U.S. state of Nebraska. He served in the Nebraska Legislature from 2007 to 2015. In 2014, he ran in the Nebraska gubernatorial election, but was defeated by Pete Ricketts in the Republican primary.

Personal life
Tom Carlson was born on December 9, 1941 in Holdrege, Nebraska. He attended the University of Northern Colorado playing football, baseball, and basketball, distinguishing himself as a talented athlete and student, earning a Bachelor of Science in 1963 and a Master of Science in 1964. He received a Ph.D. from the University of Iowa in 1967.

Carlson taught at Taylor University, where he also coached baseball and football prior to returning to Holdrege, Nebraska where he works as a financial advisor.

He is married and has three children and 4 grandchildren.  Before being elected to the State Legislature, Carlson served on the Holdrege Public School Board for eight years.

State legislature
Carlson was elected in 2006 to represent the 38th Nebraska legislative district with 54 percent of the vote. In 2010, Carlson run unopposed and was elected to a second consecutive term. Due to term limits, he was ineligible to run for a third consecutive term in 2014.

In the legislature, Carlson served as the chair of the Natural Resources Committee. He also sat on the Banking, Commerce and Insurance Committee and the Committee on Committees.

References

1941 births
Living people
Republican Party Nebraska state senators
People from Holdrege, Nebraska
School board members in Nebraska
Taylor Trojans baseball coaches
Taylor Trojans football coaches
Taylor University faculty
University of Iowa alumni
University of Northern Colorado alumni